Lawrence Ati-Zigi (born 29 November 1996) is a Ghanaian professional footballer who plays as a goalkeeper for FC St. Gallen and the Ghana national team.

Ati-Zigi has represented Ghana at under-17 and under-20 levels. He has been to two African Cup of Nations (2019 and 2021) but featured in none. He made his debut for the Ghana national team in June 2018 in a friendly against Iceland. He was the starting goalkeeper in Ghana's 2022 FIFA World Cup campaign.

Club career

Liefering 
In January 2015, Ati-Zigi joined Red Bull Salzburg from Ghanaian feeder club Red Bull Ghana. Ati-Zigi was immediately loaned out to reserve team FC Liefering who play in the Austria 2. Liga. He joined other Ghanaian players including David Atanga and Raphael Dwamena.Ati-Zigi made his league debut for Liefering on 17 April 2015, when his club beat TSV Hartberg 4–1 at Untersberg-Arena. After his debut, he went ahead to play in six consecutive league matches. At the end of his first season, he played six league matches with Liefering finishing in second place in the 2014–15 Austrian Football First League.

The following season, he featured in 16 out of 36 games as the club finished in fourth place in the 2015–16 Austrian Football First League. He also made the Red Bull Salzburg match day squad twice, due to that earned a medal as Salzburg won the 2015–16 Austrian Football Bundesliga. In his final season with Liefering, he played in 11 games to help the club secure a second place finish in the 2016–17 Austrian Football First League. In total he featured in 33 matches for Liefering in this two year stint.

Sochaux 

In July 2017, Ati-Zigi joined French team FC Sochaux-Montbéliard on a three-year deal reuniting with his former coach Peter Zeidler from Liefering and Red Bull Salzburg. He made his club debut in the first round of the in a Coupe de la Ligue on 8 August 2017 against Valenciennes which ended in a 3–1 loss. 

Over the season, he remained as the second choice goalkeeper behind Maxence Prévot being named in the match day squad for the 24 consecutive times. On 9 February 2019, seven months after signing for the club, he made his Ligue 2 debut against Stade de Reims after coming on as a substitute in the 58th minute for Prévot who sustained an injury; Ati-Zigi conceded two goals as Souchaux lost 3–0. Afterwards he kept the post for the next five league matches, keeping a clean sheet in one. At the end of his first season with Montbéliard side he had made 12 appearances. Out of the 12 appearances, four of those were in Coupe de France, for which he was the main goalkeeper. He helped the club to reach the round of 16 after three victories in the early stages, including saving a penalty in their 5–4 penalty shootout in the first round against FC Saint-Louis Neuweg and keeping a clean sheet in their round of 32 match against Ligue 1 side Amiens which ended in 6–0. They were eliminated in the round of 16, after losing to defending champions PSG by 4–1.

In the 2018–19 season, Ati-Zigi remained the second choice goalkeeper behind Prévot. He played his first league match of the season on 22 December 2018, keeping a clean sheet in their 1–0 over Lorient.

St. Gallen 
On 16 January 2020, Ati-Zigi joined Swiss-club FC St. Gallen on a two and half-year deal with his contract set to expire in June 2023. Ati-Zigi made his debut for the club against FC Lugano in a Swiss Super League match on 26 January, helping the club to a 3–1 victory. 

On 26 October 2020, in a league match against Lugano, Ati-Zigi was subjected to intense racist chants from the opponent's fan base. After the match, Lugano issued a statement and apology via social media to St. Gallen and Ati-Zigi stating – “We would like to apologize to FC St. Gallen and the player. There must be no place for racism. The club will do its best to find those responsible."

On 14 September 2022, St. Gallen announced that Ati-Zigi had signed a new two-year contract that will keep him at the Swiss club until 2025. On 25 October 2022, Ati-Zigi played his 100th Swiss Super League match, in a 1–1 draw against Servette. Prior to that he had played his 100th match in all competitions against Sion on 10 September.

International career
Ati-Zigi was a member of the Ghana national under-17 team in 2013 and he played for the team in the 2013 African U-17 Championship. In 2015, he was promoted to the Ghana under-20 side. He earned a place in the final squad for the 2015 FIFA U-20 World Cup. He started in all four games as Ghana was eliminated by Mali in the round of 16.

On 23 August 2017, Ati-Zigi received his first call-up to the Ghana senior national team for the 2018 FIFA World Cup qualification games against Congo on 1 and 5 September 2017. On 7 June 2018, Ati-Zigi made his senior national team debut for Ghana, starting and playing 90 minutes in a friendly match against Iceland that ended in a 2–2 draw.

Ati-Zigi was part of the Ghanaian team in the 2021 Africa Cup of Nations that was eliminated at the group stage of the competition.

On 14 November 2022, Ati-Zigi was named in the 26-man squad for the 2022 FIFA World Cup.  Following injuries to Ghana's first and second choice goalkeepers, Joe Wollacott and Richard Ofori, with both missing out on the competition, he was set to be the first choice goalkeeper for the Black Stars. On 17 November, he manned the post for the Black Stars and kept a clean sheet in their 2–0 pre-world cup friendly match against Switzerland. The start was his first start in over a year. 

On 24 November 2022, he made his world cup debut and started in Ghana’s opening group match of World Cup against Portugal which ended in a 3–2 loss to Ghana. In the season group game against South Korea, Ati-Zigi played the full time of the match and made several crucial saves which secured Ghana's first win at the 2022 World Cup by winning 3–2. His performance earned him positive reviews, ratings and commendations from football fans across the world.

Career statistics

International

Honours 
Red Bull Salzburg

 Austrian Bundesliga: 2015–16

St. Gallen

 Swiss Cup runners-up: 2020–21, 2021–22
Individual

 Swiss Super League Player of the Round: (Round 14, Round 23) 2022–23 season
 Swiss Super League Player of the Month: November 2022
 Swiss Super League Best Player First Half of the season: 2022–23

References

External links

 

1996 births
Living people
Ghanaian footballers
Association football goalkeepers
Ghana international footballers
2019 Africa Cup of Nations players
2. Liga (Austria) players
Ligue 1 players
Ligue 2 players
Swiss Super League players
FC Red Bull Salzburg players
FC Liefering players
FC Sochaux-Montbéliard players
FC St. Gallen players
Ghanaian expatriate footballers
Ghanaian expatriate sportspeople in Austria
Expatriate footballers in Austria
Ghanaian expatriate sportspeople in France
Expatriate footballers in France
Ghanaian expatriate sportspeople in Switzerland
Expatriate footballers in Switzerland
2022 FIFA World Cup players